Illuminati II is a cotton brand, which aims to produce cotton fabrics of the highest possible quality from organic and fair traded cotton grown in Uganda.

Introduction
Illuminati II and Noir were founded concurrently in 2005 by Danish fashion designer Peter Ingwersen, and together with the diffusion line Bllack Noir, introduced in 2008, the three brands are owned by the holding company Noir Illuminati II Holding. The Illuminati II fabrics are used in the Noir and Bllack Noir collections.

Illuminati II has been accepted into Material ConneXion's library of innovative materials, the world’s largest library of advanced, innovative, sustainable materials and with a team comprising PhD material scientists and material specialists.

Objective
Peter Ingwersen’s founding vision behind Noir was to set up a luxury fashion apparel brand that in all links of the supply chain was based upon Corporate Social Responsibility principles. However, due to extensive difficulties in finding organic yarn goods, Noir was compelled to produce its own fabrics in order to enable a collection where all links of the supply chain could live up to the code of conduct. The Illuminati II project was thus founded with the aim of securing a stable supply of organic and fair traded cotton textiles as well as refining and improving the quality of the cotton currently being produced in Uganda to obtain a quality which was applicable for a luxury brand.

Corporate social responsibility

The CSR element of Illuminati II is manifold; supporting smallholder farmers in Uganda who produce organic cotton on fair trade principles, and in the long run, keep the whole production line in Uganda. The idea behind this is to enhance the chances of farmers in an African country to develop through trade and business. The fact that the cotton is grown organically means that there is a special focus on the environment and the health of the people who grow it. The fair trade certification of the cotton ensures a fair price and focus on good working conditions for the farmers and respect for the local communities involved.

Cotton production is located in the Gulu district in Northern Uganda – an area that has been racked by the rebel army Lord’s Resistance Army for the past 20 years. The area has been free of assaults since 2006, but is still deeply affected by many years of violence and unrest. Illumiati II partakes in the normalization process of the area by offering employment and a steady source of income for the 10,000 farmers involved in the project. The farmers are thus enabled to obtain a decent living standard for themselves and their families.

CSR is implemented by adherence to the principles of the UN Global Compact. The local partner, Bruce Robertson, is organic and fair trade certified by Union, which ensures that all ILO conventions are adhered to and that the farmers get a fair price for their crop. The same principles (based on ILO conventions) are carried out in the ginnery and with the strategic partner in Uganda, Phenix Industries. The partners have been chosen based on their ability to prove that they too adhere to the principles of the UN Global Compact.

All textile processing chemicals used by Illuminati II have GOTS certificates (Global Organic Textile Standard). This standard for organic textiles covers the production, processing, manufacturing, packaging, labelling, exportation, importation and distribution of all natural fibres.

The name
Illuminati (plural of Latin illuminatus, "enlightened") derives from the Latin word Lumen, meaning light, shine or torch. Furthermore, it refers to several groups, both historical and modern, real and fictitious. The word was first founded in the 17th century by a group of scientists who challenged the conventional thinking and advocated reason as the primary source of legitimacy and authority. This period is called the Age of Enlightenment.

Inspired by a new way of thinking and challenging the existing way of consuming in the fashion industry, Illuminati II was created to offer an alternative to exploitation of the environment and poor labour conditions while still encouraging consumers to buy but with a conscience. That is why the concept is called Illuminati II: The second enlightenment period.

Partnership
The Illuminati II business proposition is dependent on partners locally and internationally. The Danish International Development Agency, DANIDA, helps to finance the Illuminati II initiative, and the local partner, Bruce Robertson from Gulu Agricultural Development Ltd, is responsible for the local day-to-day work with the farmers and the crop.

Supply chain
Illuminati II and the local partner Bruce Robertson grow the cotton organically in the Gulu district in northern Uganda. Bruce Robertson currently works with 10,000 farmers in Uganda in a cooperative set-up which excellences in crop rotation allowing for not only cotton to be grown on their plot of land but also other crops like chilli and sesame. Local Gulu Agricultural Development Ltd trainers, who support the growing of organic cotton, supervise the harvest. Once the harvest is over, the local farmer sells his crop to Gulu Agricultural Development Ltd. who then pays for the harvest by the fair trade principles. The crop is certified by Union.

Once the cotton is spun locally in Kampala, the capital of Uganda, the yarns are transported to Turkey and woven into the final Illuminati II fabrics.

References

External links
Homepage of Illuminati II

Cotton industry
Agriculture in Uganda
Fair trade brands
Organic farming organizations